Pesadha Kannum Pesume is a 2002 Indian Tamil-language film directed by Murali Krishna. The film stars Kunal, Monal, and Mamtha, while Ramji and Karunas play supporting roles. The music was composed by Bharani with editing by P. Sai Suresh and cinematography by Sri Shankar. The film was released on 17 May 2002 and was a slip-up from the director's previous film Paarvai Ondre Podhume (2001).

This film is a tribute to Monal, who died just before its release.

Plot
Vikram is a happy-go-lucky man who works in an advertising agency. He is a casanova and enjoys playing pranks on people. Vikram is in love with Swetha, who is very possessive about him. In one of his many practical jokes, he tells Swetha one day that he is already married. He even introduces her to Priya, who is a model working for him, and she convinces Swetha that they are married. Swetha is heartbroken and decides to marry a boy whom her parents chose. When Vikrma learns of this, he returns and tells her that everything was a planned joke, but to his shock, Priya who was his college mate, turns against him and continues to tell Swetha that she is Vikram's wife. Priya has an axe to grind against Vikram, because of whom her father killed himself while they were in college. Finally, all ends well.

Cast

 Kunal as Vikram
 Monal as Shweta
 Mamtha as Priya
 Ramji as Ganesh, Vikram's friend
 Karunas as Arun
 Shyam Ganesh
 Lollu Sabha Balaji
 Nizhalgal Ravi as Vikram's father
 Subhashini as Shwetha's mother
 Krithika as Vikram's sister
 Delhi Ganesh
 Mohan Raman
 Chaplin Balu
 Ishari K. Ganesh
 Scissor Manohar
 Santhanam as Vikram's friend (uncredited)

Production
The film saw the second collaboration of Kunal, Monal, director Murali Krishna and music director Bharani after the success of their first film Paarvai Ondre Podhume (2001). The film turned out to be the final film of Monal as she had killed herself prior to its release.

Soundtrack

The music was composed by Bharani.

Critical reception
The film received negative reviews. Sify called it "one of the most insipid films" and "There is nothing new about the story, presentation and even the acting of Kunal and Monal are disappointing". Balaji of Thiraipadam wrote "Considering the poor quality of the end product in that case, it should not have been difficult for the director to eliminate his mistakes, polish his skills, extract better performances from his familiar cast and make a better movie. But it is surprising and unfortunate that he has taken quite a few steps backward from his debut feature here". Screen wrote "Director Muralikrishna starts off with a good story but chooses a tame ending". Malini Mannath of Chennai Online wrote "There is nothing fresh here by way of script or narrative style, not the good music which was a chartbuster in the earlier film, and worse, the film continues long after it should have ended. There is not much by way of performances either". The Hindu wrote "That pulling a fast one once too often and playing pranks at others' expense could turn dangerous at some point is a theme that is as old as life itself. But at least the treatment could have been different."

References

2002 films
2000s Tamil-language films